Barrio Francés is a corregimiento in Bocas del Toro Province in the Republic of Panama.

Main Structures 
 Almirante Elementary School
 Baptist Church
 Catholic Church
 Chiquita Banana port.
 Colegio Parroquial San Jose
 Colón Island ferry dock 
 Cincuentenario Park
 National Bank of Panama branch with only ATM in town.
 Postal Office
 Sea Wall

Neighborhoods 
 Avenida del Puerto "Port Avenue"
 Barrio Francés
 El Parque "The Park"
 La Escuela "The School"
 La Loma "The Hill"
 La Zona "Residential Zone"
 Las Golondrinas "Swallow Fields"
 Patua Town
 Tampico

References 

 

Populated places in Bocas del Toro Province